WFLK (99.3 MHz) is a classic hits music formatted FM radio station licensed to Seneca Falls, New York and broadcasting to the Finger Lakes.

On September 1, 2016, WLLW and its classic rock format moved to 101.7 FM Geneva, New York, replacing country-formatted WFLK.  The 99.3 FM frequency picked up the WFLK calls and switched to a classic hits format, branded as "Classic Hits 99.3" at 5p.m. on September 2.

Former WLLW Programming
 The Bob and Tom Show
 Ken Paradise
 Jeff Michaels
In the Studio (radio show)
The House Of Hair
Floydian Slip.

Previous logo

References

External links
WFLK Official Website
Radio Station Info for WLLW FM

FLK
Classic hits radio stations in the United States
Radio stations established in 1968